12359 Cajigal, provisional designation , is a carbonaceous Themistian asteroid from the outer region of the asteroid belt, approximately 12 kilometers in diameter.

The asteroid was discovered on 22 September 1993, by Venezuelan astronomer Orlando Naranjo at the Llano del Hato National Astronomical Observatory, Mérida, located in the Venezuelan Andes. It was named after Venezuelan politician and scientist Juan Manuel Cajigal y Odoardo.

Orbit and classification 

Cajigal is a member of the Themis family, a dynamical family of outer-belt asteroids with nearly coplanar ecliptical orbits. It orbits the Sun at a distance of 2.7–3.7 AU once every 5 years and 9 months (2,091 days). Its orbit has an eccentricity of 0.16 and an inclination of 1° with respect to the ecliptic.

The body's observation arc begins 2 years prior to its official discovery observation, with a precovery taken at Steward Observatory (Kitt Peak–Spacewatch) in June 1991.

Physical characteristics

Lightcurve 
In September 2010, a photometric lightcurve of Cajigal obtained in the R-band by astronomers at the Palomar Transient Factory in California, gave a rotation period of  hours with a brightness variation of 0.27 magnitude.

Diameter and albedo 

According to the survey carried out by the NEOWISE mission of NASA's Wide-field Infrared Survey Explorer, Cajigal measures 11.69 and 13.052 kilometers in diameter, and its surface has an albedo of 0.098 and 0.095, respectively. The Collaborative Asteroid Lightcurve Link assumes a C-type like standard albedo for members of the Themis family of 0.08 and calculates a diameter of 10.5 kilometers with an absolute magnitude of 13.25.

Naming 

This minor planet was named after Venezuelan mathematician, engineer, and statesman, Juan Manuel Cajigal y Odoardo (1803–1856), who introduced the study of mathematics and engineering in his country with his founding of the Military Academy of Mathematics in 1831. He also installed the first astronomical telescopes in Caracas, where the Cajigal Observatory ("El Observatorio Cajigal") was later established in 1888. The official naming citation was published by the Minor Planet Center on 10 September 2003.

References

External links 
 Asteroid Lightcurve Database (LCDB), query form (info )
 Dictionary of Minor Planet Names, Google books
 Asteroids and comets rotation curves, CdR – Observatoire de Genève, Raoul Behrend
 Discovery Circumstances: Numbered Minor Planets (10001)-(15000) – Minor Planet Center
 
 

012359
Discoveries by Orlando A. Naranjo
Named minor planets
19930922